Mr and Mrs Smith and Mr Drake is an album by English psychedelic folk band the Sea Nymphs. Recorded and released in 1984 under the name Mr and Mrs Smith and Mr Drake, it was the band's only recording to be distributed prior to their 1991 reformation. The band is a side project of Cardiacs, composed of core members Tim Smith, Sarah Smith and William D. Drake.

The album was initially only available on cassette through the fan club and at concert venues. The first version of the cassette cover is dark with the logo printed in gold; the track list is handwritten. The second version has a purple satin design with a smaller gold logo; the track list is printed in gold. In 2004 it was reissued on CD by All My Eye and Betty Martin Music.

Background 
Tim Smith and William D. Drake met in 1983 when Drake was in the band Honour Our Trumpet with musician Little Sue. Smith had taught himself to sight-read music as a teenager and wanted Drake's involvement as he was classically-trained. He joined Smith's band Cardiacs as he loved the music he was first provided with.

Track listing 
Adapted from Bandcamp. All songs written by Tim Smith unless otherwise indicated.

Notes
 The lyrics of "To My Piano from Mr Drake" are adapted from "The Garden" by English poet Andrew Marvell.
 "Summer Is-a-Coming In" is based on the 13th century English round.

Personnel
Adapted from the Mr and Mrs Smith and Mr Drake liner notes.

 Tim Smith – guitars, flute, trumpets, glockensput, Woolworths organ, vocals
 Sarah Smith – clarinets, saxophones, recorders, forks, melodica, vocals
 William D. Drake – piano, television organ, forks, ballroom string machine, vocals

Notes

References

Sources

External links 

 

The Sea Nymphs (band) albums
1984 albums